The following is a list of Sites of Special Scientific Interest in the West Perth Area of Search.  For other areas, see List of SSSIs by Area of Search.

 Aldclune and Invervack Meadows
 Almondbank
 Balnaguard Glen
 Beinn A' Chuallaich
 Ben Alder And Aonach Beag
 Ben Chonzie
 Ben Heasgarnich
 Ben Lawers
 Birks of Aberfeldy
 Black Wood of Rannoch
 Bolfracks Wood
 Cambusurich Wood
 Carie and Cragganester Woods
 Carn Gorm and Meall Garbh
 Coille Chriche
 Coire Bhachdaidh
 Comrie Woods
 Connachan Marsh
 Craig More
 Creag Kinaldy
 Croftintygan Meadow
 Dalcroy Promontory
 Drummond Lochs
 Drumochter Hills
 Dunalastair Reservoir
 Edinample Meadow
 Fearnan Cowpark
 Fintulich
 Glen Lyon Woods
 Glenartney Juniper Wood
 Keltneyburn
 Linn of Tummel
 Little Glenshee
 Loch Con
 Loch Freuchie Meadows
 Loch Tay Marshes
 Loch Tummel Flush
 Logierait Mires
 Meall Dail-Chealach
 Meall Ghaordie
 Meall Reamhar
 Meggernie and Croch na Keys Woods
 Methven Woods
 Mill Dam
 Monzie Wood
 Morenish Meadow
 Pass of Killiecrankie
 Rannoch Lochs
 Rannoch Moor
 River Lyon Bank
 Schiehallion
 Shingle Islands
 Shochie Burn
 Struan Wood
 Tomnadashan Mine
 Tulach Hill
 Weem Meadow

Geography of Perth, Scotland
 
West Perth